Coity Castle in Glamorgan, Wales, is a Norman castle built by Sir Payn "the Demon" de Turberville (fl. 1126), one of the legendary Twelve Knights of Glamorgan supposed to have conquered Glamorgan under the leadership of Robert FitzHamon (d. 1107), Lord of Gloucester. Now in ruins, it stands in the community of Coity Higher near the town of Bridgend, in the County Borough of Bridgend. Very close to the castle is the battlemented parish Church of St Mary the Virgin, which dates from the 14th century.

The castle is a Grade I listed building.

History

Pre Norman Coity 
Most Norman castles in Glamorgan (e.g. Caerphilly, Cardiff, Loughor) occupy sites which had previously been Roman forts and it is likely that the Norman castle at Coity occupied the site of an existing structure. Potential Roman military activity at the site is supported by the strategic importance of the location. A Roman fort would have controlled a number of early routes and Heol Spencer, which appears on the earliest maps of the area, has been proposed as a Roman Road because of its age, importance and remarkable straightness (which today, only deviates around the castle grounds itself).

Despite this archaeological interest, no excavation has been carried out to identify any Roman remains.

First Norman Castle 

The castle began as a late 11th-century ringwork. A rectangular stone keep and the main curtain wall were added by the Normans in the 12th century, under the de Turberville family. The three-storey keep was primarily a defensive structure.

Extensive reworking took place in the 14th century, when a domestic range was attached to the keep by the middle gatehouse. New stone vaults replaced the earlier timber floors. The central octagonal pier for the vaults is still prominent among the castle ruins. An adjoining chapel wing with a tall east window was added to the first floor at the eastern end of the domestic range in the 15th century.

15th century 

Thomas de la Bere died as a minor on 28 October 1414, following which the lordship reverted to Sarah de Turberville, the youngest sister of Richard de Turberville, who had apparently produced male progeny from her marriage to William Gamage. There was in the few years following Sir Lawrence Berkerolles's death much general reshuffling of property interests in Glamorgan, for example with the Stradling family. Sarah's marriage to Sir William Gamage of Roggiett, Gwent, brought the lordship into the Gamage family, where it remained until 1584. The Gamage succession was not, however, easily achieved for in September 1412, that is to say whilst the supposed true heir the minor Thomas de la Bere was still alive, William Gamage assisted by Sir Gilbert Denys (d. 1422) of Siston, Gloucestershire, and formerly of Waterton-by-Ewenny, in Coity lordship, besieged Coity for a month, trying to oust Lady Joan Verney, wife of Sir Richard Verney and daughter of Margaret de Turberville, from the Castle. Joan, it seems, had taken up residence to assert her own claim to Coity in the confusion following Berkerolles's death. As she was a female, a widow, and without a son, clearly her claim was deemed tenuous or rather completely spurious. The entry in the Patent Rolls is:
Westminster Sept. 16, 1412. 
Commission to William Newport, Chivaler, Rees ap Thomas, John Organ, William Sparenore, Richard Delabere and Robert Wytney on information that Gilbert Denys, Chivaler, and William Gamedge, with no moderate multitude of armed men have gone to the castle of Coytif in Wales and besiege it and purpose to expel Joan, late the wife of Richard Vernon, Chivaler, from her possession of it, to go as quietly as they can to the castle and raise the siege, cause proclamation to be made that no one under pain of forfeiture shall besiege it, but those who pretend right and title in it shall sue according to law and custom. Arrest and imprison all who oppose them and certify thereon to the King in Chancery. By K. 

The king had, therefore, given a commission to his local tenants-in-chief to raise the siege and gave another commission a month later to John Grendour for the same purpose. Denys and Gamage ended up in the Tower of London for having taken the law into their own hands, from 19 November 1412 until 3 June 1413, being released after the death of Henry IV. Their action, however, proved successful in enforcing the Gamage claim to Coity. Denys's eldest daughter Joan was the wife of a certain Thomas Gamage, possibly brother of William. Another of Denys's daughters, Matilda, by his 2nd. wife, married another Thomas Gamage, son or grandson of William and Sarah, and thereby became Lady of Coity on her husband's succession, producing a son and heir John Gamage.

Tudor Period 
During the 16th century, Coity Castle, by then owned by the Gamage family, underwent a complete remodelling of the living quarters, including the addition of a storey, new windows, and two chimney stacks. The principal chambers lay on the upper floors. The range of domestic apartments comprised a central first-floor hall set above a vaulted undercroft, from which it was reached by a grand spiral stair. To the west were ground-floor service rooms, probably including a kitchen, with ovens. The base of a ruined large malting kiln remains. On the far side of the range, a tower projecting from the curtain wall contained latrines. The second floor housed private apartments.

The Gamage family held Coity until the death of John Gamage in 1584.

Later history 
The castle was abandoned around the 17th century. The castle was sold in the 18th century to the Edwins of Llanharry. Through the Edwins, the Coity lordship passed to the Earls of Dunraven.

The castle ruins are now in the care of Cadw.

Locomotive 

Great Western Railway Castle Class steam locomotive number 5035 was named Coity Castle.

See also
 List of castles in Wales
 List of Scheduled Monuments in Bridgend
 List of Cadw properties
 Castles in Great Britain and Ireland

References

Sources
 The Welsh Academy Encyclopaedia of Wales. John Davies, Nigel Jenkins, Menna Baines and Peredur Lynch (2008) pg160

External links 

Cadw: Coity Castle
Coity Castle at Wales.red website (includes many panoramic photos and other photos)

Castles in Bridgend County Borough
Castle ruins in Wales
Grade I listed castles in Wales
Grade I listed buildings in Bridgend County Borough